Almost Acoustic (Volume 1) is an iTunes-only album by the American alternative rock band Blessid Union of Souls, released on October 30, 2007. The album features acoustic versions of some of the band's biggest hits, and also short descriptions by vocalist Eliot Sloan of how the songs came to be.

Track listing

References

Blessid Union of Souls albums
2007 compilation albums